The 220th New Jersey Legislature began on January 11, 2022, following the 2021 elections for Assembly and Senate. It will end on January 9, 2024.

Assembly

Assembly composition

Assembly leadership

Assembly members
The Assembly consists of 80 members, two for each district.

Former members from this term

Notes
† First appointed to the seat 
‡ Dunn was appointed to the seat in November 2019. The appointment expired at the conclusion of the 2018–19 term in January 2020. She was reappointed again in February 2020 after the start of the next term, and then won the seat in a special election in November 2020. 
± Kean previously served in the Assembly from 2002 to 2008 
* Caputo had served as a Republican during a previous stint in the Assembly from 1968 to 1972

Senate

Senate composition

Senate leadership

Senate members
The Senate consists of 40 members, one for each district.

Former members from this term

Notes
† First appointed to the seat 
‡ Elected in a special election

See also
 2021 New Jersey General Assembly election
 2021 New Jersey State Senate election

References

External links
 

New Jersey Legislature
New Jersey General Assembly by session
New Jersey Senate by session